Stephanie Widjaja (born 19 February 2003) is an Indonesian badminton player affiliated with Jaya Raya Jakarta club. She was part of the national junior team that won the first Suhandinata Cup for Indonesia in 2019 BWF World Junior Championships. She also featured in the Indonesian women's winning team at the 2022 Asia Team Championships.

Achievements

BWF International Challenge/Series (1 title, 1 runner-up) 
Women's singles

  BWF International Challenge tournament
  BWF International Series tournament
  BWF Future Series tournament

BWF Junior International (2 runners-up) 
Girls' singles

  BWF Junior International Grand Prix tournament
  BWF Junior International Challenge tournament
  BWF Junior International Series tournament
  BWF Junior Future Series tournament

Performance timeline

National team 
 Junior level

 Senior level

Individual competitions 
 Junior level

 Senior level

References

External links 

2003 births
Living people
People from Jakarta
Sportspeople from Jakarta
Indonesian female badminton players
Indonesian people of Chinese descent
Competitors at the 2021 Southeast Asian Games
Southeast Asian Games medalists in badminton
21st-century Indonesian women